This article lists the members of the People's Representative Council from 2004 to 2009. The 16th People's Representative Council follows the 2004 Indonesian legislative election held on 5 April 2004. There are 550 elected MPs in the Parliament.

Speaker and Deputy Speaker

List of members

Aceh

North Sumatra

West Sumatra

Riau

Riau Islands

Jambi

South Sumatra

Bangka Belitung

Bengkulu

Lampung

Jakarta

Banten

West Java

Central Java

Yogyakarta

East Java

West Kalimantan

Central Kalimantan

East Kalimantan

South Kalimantan

South Sulawesi

Central Sulawesi

Gorontalo

North Sulawesi

Southeast Sulawesi

North Maluku

Maluku

Bali

West Nusa Tenggara

East Nusa Tenggara

West Papua

Papua

References 

Anggota Dewan Perwakilan Rakyat Republik Indonesia Periode 2004-2009 (Part 1)
Anggota Dewan Perwakilan Rakyat Republik Indonesia Periode 2004-2009 (Part 2)
Anggota Dewan Perwakilan Rakyat Republik Indonesia Periode 2004-2009 (Part 3)
Anggota Dewan Perwakilan Rakyat Republik Indonesia Periode 2004-2009 (Part 4)

Lists of members of the People's Representative Council